Slawharad District (Slavgorodsky raion) is a raion (district) in Mogilev Region, Belarus, the administrative center is the town of Slawharad. As of 2009, its population was 14,888. Population of Slawharad accounts for 53.7% of the district's population.

References

 
Districts of Mogilev Region